Thomas W. Bartingale was a member of the Wisconsin State Assembly.

Biography
Bartingale was born on June 24, 1851 in Ely, England. He was an organizer for the American Society of Equity, and would become involved in the lumber business.

Political career
Bartingale was a member of the Assembly during the 1913, 1919 and 1921 sessions. In 1923, he was elected Sergeant at Arms of the Assembly. He was a Republican.

References

People from Ely, Cambridgeshire
English emigrants to the United States
Republican Party members of the Wisconsin State Assembly
Employees of the Wisconsin Legislature
1851 births
Year of death missing
Leaders of the American Society of Equity